Step Out is the debut album by Busy Signal. It was released on June 27, 2006.

Track listing
 "Step Out"  – 2:57 download
 "Where I'm From" – 2:24
 "Everybody Busy" – 3:08
 "That Bad" – 2:37
 "I Love Yuh" (featuring Alaine) – 2:31
 "Do the Maths" (featuring Bounty Killer) – 2:26
 "Badman Place" (featuring Mavado) – 3:16
 "Bare Tings" – 3:12
 "Love Me Not?" – 3:39
 "Ava Interlude" – 1:24
 "Mammy" – 3:15
 "Born and Grow" – 3:31
 "Guns Fi Dubs Interlude" – 0:39
 "Full Clip" (featuring Mavado) – 3:05
 "Relationship Interlude" – 0:29
 "Since U Been Away" (featuring Kris Kelly) – 2:46
 "Full a Talk" – 3:00
 "Not Going Down" – 6:52
 "Pon Di Pole" (Bonus Track) * – 3:16

External links

Busy Signal albums
2006 debut albums